Jämlitz-Klein Düben (Lower Sorbian: Jemjelica-Źěwink) is a municipality in the district of Spree-Neiße, in Brandenburg, Germany.

Demography

References

Populated places in Spree-Neiße